In the theory of 3-manifolds, a compression body is a kind of generalized handlebody.

A compression body is either a handlebody or the result of the following construction:

 Let  be a compact, closed surface (not necessarily connected).   Attach 1-handles to  along .

Let  be a compression body. (If  is a handlebody then .) The positive boundary of C, denoted , is  minus the negative boundary.

Compression bodies often arise when manipulating Heegaard splittings.

References 

 

3-manifolds

de:Henkelkörper#Kompressionskörper